The Mangonuiowae River is a river of New Zealand's Northland Region.

See also
List of rivers of New Zealand

References

Rivers of the Northland Region
Rivers of New Zealand